Hero Academy was a two-player turn-based tactics video game created by the developer Robot Entertainment, known for their previous series Orcs Must Die!. The game was first released for the iPhone iOS platform on January 11, 2012, with ports later being released for the Microsoft Windows, OS X and Android platforms. In the game, players take turns moving units on a board and attacking enemy units with the objective of being the first to destroy the other player's crystal or eliminate all of the other player's units. The game received generally favorable reviews from critics. In his review for Ars Technica, Andrew Webster noted that the gameplay was simple and easy to learn, but that the game also offered a satisfying depth within each turn. The game also features cross platform play across all installed platforms. A sequel to the game was launched in January 2018. On January 9, 2019, Robot Entertainment announced in a blog post that Hero Academy and its sequel would cease operations on April 8, 2019 as one had been long defunct and its sequel had been operating at a financial loss for several months.

Gameplay
The game is turn-based and focuses on strategy, requiring players to carefully plan out each step of their turn. Each player has one or many crystals and the objective is to be the first player to either eliminate all of the other player's units or destroy the other player's crystal(s). Each turn grants players five moves in the game. Units are played from a hand which is replenished at the end of each round with random new units. In addition to units, a player's hand can also contain spells and healing potions as well as weapons and armor which can be equipped to units. Ars Technica writer Andrew Webster noted that the gameplay was simple for a strategy game, which would "make it easy to pick up and play."

Factions
The game currently contains six factions known as Heroic Teams. 
 Council is a team made up of human units, and is the default team of the game. 
 Dark Elves is an expansion team made up of mystical elvish creatures who are known for dark magic. 
 Dwarves is an expansion team that consists of dwarf characters known for explosive attacks and bonuses to specialty squares.
 The Tribe is an expansion team made up of orc-related units, known for aggression. 
 Team Fortress 2 is a team available exclusively to Steam users, but can be played on all platforms; the team is known for its adaptability and gameplay referencing the Team Fortress 2 title. 
 Shaolin is an expansion team previously exclusive to the Chinese version of the game; the human team is known for its conversion powers and combination attacks.

Development
The game was first announced by the developer Robot Entertainment on November 17, 2011, for the iOS platform. The company was founded by Tony Goodman and its first employees were predominantly taken from the recently bankrupt Ensemble Studios, a studio that had previously worked on strategy games including the Age of Empires series and Halo Wars. The new company's first mobile game, Hero Academy was released on January 11, 2012, with an adware version offered for free or an ad-free version available for purchase. At the time of the release, additional downloadable content was made available for purchase including extra avatars, heroic teams, and visual and animation style changes. The purchasable content is primarily visual cosmetic changes and does not offer better units or items which would give a player an advantage. In addition to the cosmetic offerings, the Dark Elves faction includes a new set of skills which Ars Technica writer Andrew Webster called "different but not necessarily stronger" and likened to purchasing an expansion pack.

In a bid to bring western mobile games to China, the Chinese publisher Yodo1 partnered with the developers in June 2012. The untranslated English version of the game was already receiving more downloads from China than any other country except the United States. Beyond translating the game, the Chinese Yodo1 version also has a new race to play in the game, Shaolin monks, as well as other new characters exclusive to the localized version.

The company announced in June 2012 that it would port the game to Microsoft Windows with a planned release date set for August 8, 2012, via the Steam digital distribution platform. After missing their target, the company released a statement saying that some players were having issues with the game that needed to be resolved before it could be released, and they planned to make the game available for the platform on August 16 at the latest. The developers beat their deadline, releasing the game onto Steam on August 10. On December 11, 2012, a port of the game to the OS X platform was released via Steam. On October 10, 2013, a port of the game for Android has been released on Google Play.

Reception
The game received predominantly positive reviews upon release, garnering a 77% rating on the review aggregation website Metacritic. Ars Technica reviewer Andrew Webster wrote that the gameplay was simple compared to other strategy games which made it easy to learn the rules, and he recommended the game stating, "there's enough depth to make each quick round surprisingly satisfying." Webster also noted that the game was best played with friends rather than anonymous players since this would ensure turns would finish without delay.

Sequel
Hero Academy 2 was soft launched in Canada on October 23, 2017. The official launch was January 16, 2018.

The sequel was nominated for "Best Multiplayer/Competitive Game" at the 2018 Webby Awards.

References

Further reading

External links
Official website
Official sequel website

2012 video games
Fantasy video games
IOS games
MacOS games
Multiplayer video games
Turn-based tactics video games
Video games developed in the United States
Windows games
Linux games
Robot Entertainment games